The MG 13 (shortened from German Maschinengewehr 13) is a German light machine gun developed by converting the Dreyse Model 1918 heavy water-cooled machine gun into an air-cooled version.

History
Dreyse Model 1918 Machinegun: In 1907 Louis Schmeisser of Erfurt patented a machine-gun named in honor of the inventor of the needle gun by the heads of the factory where it was made which was founded by Dreyse. The Dreyse machine-gun was a heavy, usually tripod mounted, belt-fed and water cooled machine-gun.

The 1907 model was succeeded by the 1912 and later 1918 models. It was ordered the Model 1918 to be modernized by the company Simson in Suhl. It became the MG13.

Usage

The MG 13 was introduced into service in 1930, where it served as the standard light machine gun until 1935. It was superseded by the MG 34 and then later the MG 42.

An unusual feature of the MG 13 was its double-crescent trigger, which provided select fire capability without the need for a fire mode selector switch. Pressing the upper segment of the trigger produced semi-automatic fire, while holding the lower segment of the trigger produced fully automatic fire. It also fired from a closed bolt.

MG 13s were sold to Spain where they retained the designation of MG13 and to Portugal which used them into the late 1940s as the Metralhadora 7,92 mm m/1938 Dreyse. Those MG 13's that were not sold but rather were placed into storage later saw use in World War II by second line German units. As it was easy to handle and reload, many second line troops could use the MG 13 with efficiency.

On later examples a 75-round saddle drum was also used. It was equipped with a folding butt stock and a carrying handle. It was used in the turret of the Panzer I tank. 

The Chinese Nationalist Government also imported the MG 13 with the Panzer I Ausf A. tanks from Germany in 1936. The MG 13 was also used against the Japanese Imperial Army during the Second Sino-Japanese War. Portugal used it as squad automatic weapon during Portuguese Colonial War, under the name m/938.

Users

 : Norwegian Police received ex-German MG-13s after WWII and converted them to MG-13k.

References

External links

 (Manual for the MG 13)
 (Photo gallery)

Light machine guns
World War II infantry weapons of Germany
World War II machine guns
Machine guns of Germany
Military equipment introduced in the 1930s